The CASA C-295 (now Airbus C295) is a medium tactical transport aircraft that was designed and initially manufactured by the Spanish aerospace company CASA.

Work on what would become the C-295 was started during the 1990s as a derivative of the successful CASA/IPTN CN-235 transport aircraft. On 28 November 1997, the prototype performed its maiden flight; quantity production commenced shortly thereafter. In April 1999, the Spanish Air Force became its launch customer with an order for nine military-configured C-295s; two years later, the type was declared operational with the service. Further orders for the C-295 would promptly follow. Following the incorporation of CASA into the pan-European aeronautical group EADS in 2000, it was redesignated as the EADS CASA C-295.

Both manufacturing and final assembly of the C-295 is normally performed at the Airbus Defence and Space facilities in San Pablo Airport, located in Seville, Spain. Additional manufacturing arrangements have been agreed with some customers. Since 2011, Indonesian Aerospace has produced the CN-295 under license at their facilities in Bandung, Indonesia, via an industrial collaboration with Airbus Defence & Space. During 2021, it was agreed that, as a part of a larger purchase, a batch of 40 C-295s would be license-manufactured in India by Tata Advanced Systems Limited.

Beyond its use as a tactical transporter, the C-295 is capable of performing a wide variety of missions effectively. These included parachute and cargo dropping, electronic signals intelligence (ELINT), medical evacuation (MEDEVAC), and maritime patrol. Some of the equipment for adapting the aircraft to performing various roles has been mounted onto pallets, allowing for its rapid installation and removal. On account of the lack of sales achieved by the CN-235 in the commercial aviation segment, although civil certification was obtained as to facilitate its use by government agencies, a commercial version of the C-295 was not pursued for some time by the company. It was not until 2017, over a decade after military-orientated C-295s had entered regular service, that the first contract for a civilian C-295 was finalised.

The C-295 has been acquired by multiple nations including Spain, Egypt, Poland, Canada, Brazil, Mexico, Portugal and others. It has also participated in numerous international operations, including those in the former Yugoslavia, Afghanistan, Iraq, Lebanon, and Chad.

Development

Initial development

During November 1996, the Spanish aerospace company CASA formally started development work on the C-295. It was derived from the CASA/IPTN CN-235, a Spanish–Indonesian transport aircraft; its principal differences were its stretched fuselage, a 50% increase in  payload capacity and the adoption of more powerful Pratt & Whitney Canada PW127G turboprop engines. On 28 November 1997, the first prototype made its maiden flight. During April 1999, it was announced that the C-295's first order had been placed by the Spanish Air Force, which sought nine military transport aircraft. During December 1999, it was certificated as airworthy by both the Spanish Dirección General de Aviación Civil and the American Federal Aviation Administration. In November 2001, deliveries began to the Spanish Air Force.

Further development
During June 2012, Airbus Military announced several enhancements to the base C-295 design, changes included the adoption of winglets and an ability to carry the Marte anti-ship missile; a dedicated airborne early warning and control variant was also planned. In November 2015, a C-295 successfully demonstrated a new self-protection suite, which incorporated elements such as directional infrared countermeasures from Elbit Systems and infrared passive airborne warning system. During January 2016, Airbus was in the process of developing a new probe-and-drogue aerial refuelling rig to be optionally installed in the centerline of the C295, facilitating the aerial refuelling of helicopters. Furthermore, the company was also implementing flap optimisations and other modifications upon the type to enable it to perform extremely short takeoff and landing capabilities. In November 2019, it was announced that Airbus had selected Collins Aerospace to integrate its Pro Line Fusion flight deck onto future C-295s, which shall reportedly reduce pilot workload and easily facilitate further upgrades via its modular design.

In January 2022, it was announced that Airbus had flown its C295 Flight Test Bed 2 Sky 2 for the first time; development of this upgraded aircraft was funded by the European Union's Horizon 2020 research program and it is intended to test various technologies related to future regional multi-mission aircraft. Modifications include a high-efficiency semi-morphing wing, dynamic winglets, a flat panel SATCOM antenna integrated into the upper fuselage, along with innovative flight controls for the primary control surfaces to achieve improved aerodynamics and contribute to a more efficient high-lift system.

Design
The EADS CASA C-295 is a tactical transport aircraft, designed for the movement of personnel and cargo within military conditions. Accordingly, it can be operated from austere airstrips with minimal reliance on ground support infrastructures; it can reportedly be operated on soft ground without major issues even when heavily loaded. It has an auto-reverse capability, being able to turn 180º on runways as narrow as 12 meters wide. The dimensions of its cargo hold, 12.69 × 1.90 × 2.70  meters, are roughly three meters longer in comparison to the preceding CN-235. It has sufficient volume to carry up to 71 soldiers, 24 stretchers along with up to seven medical attendants, five standard 108" pallets of cargo, or three Land Rover-sized light vehicles. It is suitable for airdropping paratroopers and cargo on 88-inch-wide platforms.

The C-295 has also been designed to facilitate multi-role operations and has been produced in a wide range of configurations. Numerous customers have opted to arm their aircraft to perform intelligence surveillance and reconnaissance (ISR) operations, being outfitted with various sensors such as a multi-mission radar unit; it can even be equipped as a gunship and tasked with providing close air support to ground forces. When appropriately furnished, the C-295 can conduct electronic signals intelligence (ELINT), medical evacuation (MEDEVAC),  and maritime patrol aircraft (MPA) duties. Palletised equipment, enabling its rapid installation and removal, is available to outfit the aircraft for use as a VIP transport, aerial refuelling tanker, and water bomber.

The cockpit of the C-295 is furnished with dual controls, having been intended to be flown by a pilot and a co-pilot. It is typically equipped with the Highly Integrated Avionics System (HIAS), based on the digital Topdeck suite produced by the French avionics firm Thales. It also features an Integrated Engine Data and Warning System that manages the engine and fuel systems and alerts pilots to detected faults along with other key information. A Honeywell RDR-1400C weather radar is also typically installed to facilitate instrument flight rules (IFR) operations. The avionics have been designed so that the aircraft can also be operated according to civil standards as well as military ones, including the stringent FAR-25 requirements.

Typically, the C-295 is powered by a pair of Pratt & Whitney Canada PW127G turboprop engines, each capable of providing up to 2,645 SHP (1,972 kW). These feature a modular design that facilitates easy access and reduced maintenance requirements, reportedly enabling up to 10,000 flight hours of uninterrupted operation before requiring servicing. The normal propellers used are six-bladed scimitar-shaped units, having a diameter of 3.89 meters and built from composite materials by Hamilton Standard.

The C-295 is equipped with a retractable undercarriage in a tricycle configuration, designed by Messier-Dowty. Two side fairings on the lower part of the fuselage accommodate the retracted main landing gear, while an alcove almost directly beneath the cockpit houses the forward landing gear. The undercarriage is durable enough to enable operations from semi-prepared runways. It is equipped with oleo-pneumatic shock absorbers, disc brakes capable of differential braking, and an anti-skid system.

Operational history
The first order for the C-295 was for the Spanish Air Force: during 2000, the Future Medium Transport Aircraft II (FATAM II) program was launched, under which a batch of nine C-295s was ordered to take the place of eight CN-235s that had been converted from general transports into maritime patrol and search-and-rescue aircraft, their reassignment having noticeably depleted the service's medium transport fleet.

The first export customer of the C-295 was the Polish Air Force, initially ordering eight aircraft in 2001, with deliveries commencing two years later. The service bought the type to supplement and eventually replace their Cold War-era Antonov An-26 transports. Further C-295s were ordered by Poland, including to two each in both 2006 and 2007. In June 2012, another five aircraft were ordered, all of which were delivered by the end of 2013. Polish C-295s are typically based at Kraków-Balice Air Base. They have participated in overseas activities, including NATO operations, such as humanitarian air efforts in Kosovo in 2020. A single C-295 is routinely deployed as a support aircraft for the Orlik Aerobatic Team, the Polish Air Force's aerial display unit. One aircraft crashed on 23 January 2008.

Another key country for the C-295 has been Indonesia. Indonesian Aerospace (Indonesian: PT Dirgantara Indonesia), which also locally manufactured the CN-235, performs the final assembly of C-295s for customers within Indonesia. The company has been keen to secure a license that would allow it to produce the aircraft for export customers outside of the domestic market, although Airbus has been allegedly reluctant to agree terms for such an extension. In September 2012, the first part of C-295s were delivered to the Indonesian Air Force. Further aircraft has since been delivered to the service to replace the aged Fokker F27 fleet for tactical and logistical transport duties.

During the 2010s, Egypt became the largest operator of the C-295, having a fleet of 21 aircraft as of April 2021. In October 2010, the order of an initial three aircraft for tactical and logistical transport by Egypt was announced. The first delivery was on 24 September 2011. During January 2013, a follow-on order was signed for six more aircraft and a further eight was ordered on 16 July 2014. In early 2021, Egypt signed a five-year performance-based servicing agreement with Airbus regarding its C-295 fleet, which included the provision of material services, on-site support, and on-wing maintenance activities.

During the 2020s, India stated its intent to place the largest single order for the type; the Cabinet Committee on Security approved the ordering of 56 C-295Ws to equip the Indian Air Force in September 2021. Of these, it is planned for 16 aircraft to be delivered in flyaway condition from Spain within 48 months of the contract's signing, while a further 40 aircraft are to be manufactured in India by Tata Advanced Systems Limited within the following ten years.

A major competitor for export sales of the C-295 has been the C-27J Spartan, manufactured previously by Alenia Aeronautica (2006-2012) and Alenia Aermacchi (2012-2016), and now by Leonardo S.p.A. The C-295 was a major bidder for the US Army–US Air Force Joint Cargo Aircraft (JCA) programme but lost to the L-3 Communications/Alenia team for the C-27J in June 2007. The C-295 was reportedly considered by the US Army to pose a greater risk due to its use of a new operational mode to meet altitude and range requirements. Among other contracts the C-295 lost to the C-27J are the Peruvian Air Force's Antonov An-32 replacement and the Royal Australian Air Force's de Havilland Canada DHC-4 Caribou replacement.

While the vast majority of C-295 sales have been to military operators, it has been certified for civil purposes as well. During August 2018, it was announced that the Irish leasing company Stellwagen Group has leased a single C-295 to DAC Aviation International, it being the first civil operator of the type in Africa. This aircraft has participated in humanitarian operations, such as the delivery of anti-cholera kits, food, water, sanitation, and hygiene goods to Mozambique.

In 2019, the Royal Canadian Air Force ordered 16 CC-295s as a replacement search and rescue aircraft for its ageing fleets of CC-115 Buffalo and older-model C-130H Hercules. They are to be operated from Greenwood, Nova Scotia (413 Transport and Rescue Squadron); Trenton, Ontario (424 Transport and Rescue Squadron); Winnipeg, Manitoba (435 Transport and Rescue Squadron); and Comox, British Columbia (442 Transport and Rescue Squadron and 418 Search and Rescue Operational Training Squadron). The aircraft will be primarily operated at CFB Comox, where Airbus set up an RCAF Search & Rescue Training Facility for the CC-295. The first aircraft arrived in Canada in September 2020. Another aircraft that arrived in January 2020 is a trainer for the maintenance personnel, and is not included in the 16 aircraft ordered.

The C-295 MPA was a candidate to replace the German Navy's P-3C maritime patrol aircraft, possibly as a stopgap solution from 2025 to 2032. During 2021, it was speculated that a combined order with Spain could be achieved. However, during July 2021, Germany announced that it had ordered five P-8 Poseidons to fulfil this need.

Variants

C-295M
Military transport version. Capacity for 71 troops, 48 paratroops, 27 stretchers, five 2.24 × 2.74 m (88 × 108 inches) pallets, or three light vehicles.
CN-295
Locally-produced variant by Indonesian Aerospace under license in Bandung, Indonesia.
C-295 MPA/Persuader
Maritime patrol/anti-submarine warfare version. Provision for six hardpoints.
C-295 AEW&C
Prototype airborne early warning and control version with EL/W-2090 360 degree radar dome. The AESA radar was developed by Israel Aerospace Industries (IAI) and has an integrated IFF (Identification friend or foe) system.
C-295 Firefighter
Dedicated aerial firefighting aircraft.
CC-295 Kingfisher
Dedicated search and rescue aircraft for the Royal Canadian Air Force based on C-295W.
C-295 SIGINT
Dedicated signals intelligence version.
C-295W
Upgraded model, equipped with wingtip devices (winglets) to improve performance in the takeoff, climb, and cruise phases of flight by increasing the lift-drag ratio.
C-295 ISR
Armed variant equipped with machine guns, small-caliber automatic cannons, rocket launchers, laser-guided bombs, and anti-tank missiles.
AC-295 Gunship
Gunship version developed by Airbus Defence and Space, Orbital ATK, and the King Abdullah II Design and Development Bureau, based on the AC-235 Light Gunship configuration.
KC-295
Dedicated tanker aircraft.

Operators

The C-295 is in service with the armed forces of 15 countries. By 31 August 2015, 136 C-295s had been ordered with 134 in service and two lost in accidents.

 The Algerian Air Force received six C-295s for transport and maritime patrol. One lost in an accident.

 The Angolan Air Force ordered two C-295s for maritime patrol duties and one for transport.

 The Bangladesh Army Aviation Group operates two C-295W for tactical transport.

 The Brazilian Air Force received 13 C-295s, designated C-105A Amazonas, to replace their ageing DHC-5/C-115 Buffalo transports. Additional orders are to raise the total to 15 by 2020.

 The Royal Brunei Air Force signed a contract for the acquisition of one C-295, as of 14 December 2022, and to become the 39th operator worldwide and the eighth in the Asia-Pacific region.

 The Burkina Faso Air Force has taken delivery of one C-295, registration XT-MBH, as of 16 November 2021.

 The Royal Canadian Air Force ordered 16 CC-295s in 2016 to replace its ageing fleet of CC-115 Buffalo and older-model C-130H Hercules search and rescue aircraft. All aircraft were expected to be delivered by the end of 2022. However, initial operating capability is delayed until 2025/26.

 The Chilean Navy operates three C-295 MPAs.

 The Colombian Air Force operates six C-295s; the last of the original four was delivered in April 2009. The fifth aircraft was ordered in September 2012 and delivered 14 March 2013. The sixth aircraft was ordered in January 2013, entering service before 31 August 2015.

 The Czech Air Force ordered four C-295 to replace their fleet of Antonov An-26s, all having been delivered in 2010. They are based at Kbely Air Force Base. Two more were ordered in 2017.

 The Ecuadorian Air Force operates three aircraft.

 The Egyptian Air Force operates 24 C-295s as of August 2018.

 Equatorial Guinea Air Force – Two (one transport and one surveillance) aircraft on order for delivery from September 2016.

 The Finnish Air Force operates three C-295s. There is an option for four more additional aircraft.

 The Ghanaian Air Force operates two C-295s and has ordered a third one.

 India has ordered 56 C-295Ws for the Indian Air Force, with a plan to order an additional 6 aircraft for the Indian Coast Guard and 9 aircraft for the Indian Navy.

 The Indonesian Air Force operates eight C-295s for tactical and logistical transport, having replaced its elderly Fokker F27 Friendships. One C-295 is on order as of August 2015.
 The Indonesian National Police operates one CN-295 for personnel and logistical transport.

 The Irish Air Corps ordered two C-295 Maritime Patrol Aircraft in December 2019 to replace their CN-235 aircraft. The purchase of additional C-295s for general transport duties was also being evaluated as of June 2022.

 The Air Force of Ivory Coast ordered one C-295 on 21 January 2019.

 The Royal Jordanian Air Force operates three C-295s and has another one on order as of August 2015.

 The Kazakh Air Force operates eight C-295s. In March 2019, Kazakhstan awarded Airbus a contract to produce a ninth C-295 for the Kazakh Air Force.

Air Force of Mali – one C-295W ordered in February 2016, delivered in December 2016.

 The Mexican Air Force operates eight C-295Ms. They operate in the 301st Squadron, based in Santa Lucia AFB.
 The Mexican Navy operates four C-295Ms & two C-295Ws. They are based at the Tapachula Air Naval Base.

 The Royal Air Force of Oman operates six C-295s and has two on order as of August 2015.

 The Philippine Air Force operates four C-295Ms and three C-295Ws.

 The Polish Air Force has received 17 C-295s, one of which has been lost in a crash. The service is the first export customer for the aircraft, first ordering it in 2001.

 The Portuguese Air Force received 12 C-295s, including seven transport (PG01) and five Persuader Maritime Patrol Aircraft (C-295 MPA, three PG02 and two PG03), to replace the C-212 Aviocar. They are operated by 502 Squadron and are based at Montijo Air Base, near Lisbon.

 The Ministry of Interior has ordered four C-295Ws in June 2015.

 The Senegalese Air Force has received 1 C-295W in July 2022 and has another one on order 

 The Serbian Air Force and Air Defence has ordered two C-295Ws in 2021 with expected delivery in 2023.

 The Spanish Air and Space Force operates 13 C-295s (designated internally T.21).

 The Royal Thai Army operates two C-295Ws.

 The United Arab Emirates Air Force ordered five C-295Ws.

 The United States Air Force has one Airbus C-295W Persuader in use as of 2023.

 The Uzbekistan Air and Air Defence Forces ordered four C-295Ws.

 The Vietnam People's Air Force operates three C-295 aircraft.

Accidents and notable incidents
 In the Mirosławiec air accident on 23 January 2008, a Polish Air Force C-295 flying from Warsaw via Powidz and Krzesiny to Mirosławiec crashed during its approach to the 12th Air Base near Mirosławiec. All 20 people on board were killed in the accident. All Polish C-295s were grounded after the incident. Polish defence minister Bogdan Klich dismissed five air force personnel after the accident investigation, which concluded that multiple failings contributed to 23 January crash.
 On 31 October 2011, the Czech Army grounded its fleet of four C-295Ms due to an in-flight equipment failure onboard one aircraft. While landing, one of its two engines stopped working. Prior to this, a cockpit display and other equipment had also failed. The plane landed safely on its remaining engine. General Vlastimil Picek ordered the grounding of all aircraft until an inquiry ended. The fleet was previously grounded in February 2011, following a severe drop in altitude in mid-flight, and again in May due to avionics problems.
 On 9 November 2012, an Algerian Air Force C-295 crashed in the Lozère region of southern France while flying from Paris to Algeria with the loss of all six people on board.

Specifications (C-295M)

See also

References

Citations

Bibliography

Further reading

External links

 C295 maritime patrol aircraft (Naval technology)
 Maritime Patrol Aircraft400005/0/52/434520.pdf EADS product sheet (PDF)
 C-295M twin turboprop transport aircraft, Spain
 Team JCA's C-295/CN-235 Transport Aircraft Fleet Completes 1 Million Flights
 Team JCA's C-295 Advances to Phase II Evaluation for Joint Cargo Aircraft Program.
 Military Services Competing For Future Airlift Missions

CASA C-295
CASA C-295
2000s Spanish military transport aircraft
High-wing aircraft
Aircraft first flown in 1997
Twin-turboprop tractor aircraft